The Columbia Institute for Tele-Information (CITI) is one of several research centers for Columbia Business School, focusing on strategy, management, and policy issues in telecommunications, computing, and electronic mass media. It aims to address the large and dynamic telecommunications and media industry that has expanded horizontally and vertically drive by technology, entrepreneurship and policy.

History 
Founded in 1983 at Columbia University, the institute is the first research center for communications economics, management, and policy established at a US management school. Its location in New York City provides a unique foundation for these activities. Research collaboration among academic, corporate, and public sectors is vital in analyzing the complex problems associated with managing communications enterprises, systems, and policy in environments of rapidly changing technology and regulation.

Funding 
In 2000, the Alfred P. Sloan Foundation selected the institute as its fifteenth academic center for industry research and the only one for the field of telecommunications. This enables CITI to substantially expand its program of research on the telecommunications sector. CITI conducts research on all forms of networks, IT, and electronic media industries.  The Sloan Foundation's main objective is for each of its centers to build an academic base of observations and knowledge in order to make practical contributions to the industries studied and accelerate U.S. economic development and global competitiveness. It aims to foster academic-industry collaboration and to develop scholarly expertise by educating the next generation of doctoral students.

Background 
The Columbia Institute for Tele-Information is directed by Professor Eli Noam.  The Institute is part of Columbia University's traditionally strong role in communications research, going back to Paul Lazarsfeld (audience research methodologies), Edwin Howard Armstrong (FM radio), Michael I. Pupin (long distance transmission), Harvey J. Levin (economic regulation of broadcasting), and Charles Townes and Arthur Schawlow (laser). The Columbia Institute for Tele-Information draws upon the excellent resources of several university departments beyond the Columbia Business School. The School of Engineering and Applied Science is a technology center focusing on the integration of telecommunications networks. The School of Journalism studies the impact and applications of new technology for Journalism. The Institute for Learning Technologies at Teacher's College studies and develops new technology applications. The Law School is strong in issues of intellectual property.  The School of the Arts has major involvement in content production such as film.  And the School of International and Public Affairs deals with global policy issues.

The Institute's research activities are determined by the University's academic principles, and the advice of an Advisory Board drawn from industry, universities, government, and other sectors. All research is public.

CITI Fellows

In 2012 CITI initiated a Fellows Program. Benjamin Compaine is the Director of the Program. The 25 Fellows selected each year are high level government and corporate policy makers along with leading academic and nonprofit researchers.  Fellows are expected to participate in monthly virtual one hour seminars held using a video conferencing platform. Speakers are asked to present content that is forward looking, offering new data, raising impending issues and promoting discussion among the Fellows. Speakers often benefit from the feedback provided by the expertise of the assembled Fellows. All sessions are held under the Chatham House Rule

Fellows for 2017-2018:

Jonathan Aronson-- Prof., Communications & Intl Relations, University of Southern Calif. 
Jonathan Askin -- Prof., Brooklyn Law School 
Robert C. Atkinson-- Director of Policy Studies, CITI and co-director CITI Fellows 
Johannes Bauer --Prof. of Telecom, Michigan State University 
Erik  Bohlin --Prof., Tech Assessment, Chalmers University, Sweden 
Julie Brill— Corporate Vice President and Deputy General Counsel, Microsoft
Ben Compaine –Co-director and Senior Fellow, CITI
Michelle Connolly--Professor of the Practice of Economics, Duke University 
Bill Dutton -- Director, Quello Center, Michigan State University 
Robert Frieden -- Pioneer Professor-School of Communications,  Penn State 
Martha Garcia-Murillo -- Professor- University of Syracuse 
Andrea Glorioso - -Counselor, ICT & Digital Economy, Delegation of the EU to the USA 
Heather Hudson -- Director of Telecom Mgmt, University of San Francisco 
Jonathan Levy- -Deputy Chief Economist, Federal Communications Commission 
Michael Nelson --Internet Studies, Georgetown University 
W. Russell Neuman-- Prof, Media Technology, NYU School of Culture, Education, and Human Development 
Andrew Odlyzko—Professor, School of Mathematics, University of Minnesota
Jean Prewitt --President and CEO, Independent Film & Television Alliance 
Gregg Sayre --Commissioner, New York State Public Service Commission 
Henning Schulzerine-- Former Chief Technology Officer, Federal Communications Commission 
Marvin Sirbu--Prof., Engineering and Public Policy, Carnegie Mellon University
Larry Strickling, former Assistant Secretary of Commerce for Communications and Information
Elena Vartanova --Dean, Faculty of Journalism, Moscow State University 
Leonard Waverman, dean of the DeGroote School of Business at McMaster University
Kevin Werbach--Professor, Wharton School, University of Pennsylvania
Steve Wildman --Senior Fellow, Silicon Flatirons Center and visiting scholar, University of  Colorado
Christopher Yoo Professor,--University of Pennsylvania Law School 

Speakers have included:

 Ed Richards, U.K.Ofcom 
 John Perry Barlow, Electronic Frontier Foundation
 Reed Hundt, past chairman, U.S. Federal Communications Commission
 Blair Levin, Brookings Institution
 Richard Taylor, Penn State University 
 Gigi Sohn, Public Knowledge 
 David Young, Verizon
 Jon Irwin, Rhapsody 
 Michael Copps’ Former FCC Commissioner 
 Irwin Jacobs, Qualcomm founder
 Sharon Gillett and Mike Nelson, Microsoft
 Chris Anderson, 3D Robotics
 Holly Goodier, BBC
 Harold Feld, Public Knowledge
 Milo Medin, Google
 Adam Thierer, Mercatus Center, George Mason University                                                                                                                          
 David Salant, Toulouse School of Economics 
 Bob Frankston, Co-founder, SDiftware Arts
 Marc Rotenberg, President, Electronic Privacy Information Center
 Lee McKnight, Kauffman, Syracuse University
 Craig Moffett, MoffettNathanson
 Jim Baller, Baller Herbst Law Group
 Salil Dalvi, former NBCUniversal
 Rob Atkinson, Information Technology & Innovation Foundation
 Esther Dyson, angel investor, philanthropist, and commentator
 Eli Goodman, comScore, Inc.
 James Katz, Boston University 
 Christopher Libertelli, Netflix
 Jeff Smuylan, Emmis Communications
 David_Quinalty, Commerce Committee, U.S. Senate
 Min Hang, Tsinghua University
 Rick Whitt, Google
 Michael Kende, Internet Society
 Scott Marcus, former Director of WIK-Consult GmbH
 October 3: David Farber, Professor of Computer Science at the University of Pennsylvania and at Carnegie Mellon University.
 Larry Strickling, who stepped down in January after eight years as U.S. Assistant Secretary of Commerce for Communications and Information.
 Andrew Wise, U.S. Federal Communications Commissions' Deputy Division Chief in the Media Bureau.
 Dan Castro, director of the Center for Data Innovation and vice president of the Information Technology and Innovation Foundation.
 Tom Hazlett, H.H. Macaulay Endowed Professor in Economics  and Director of the Information Economy Project at Clemson University.
 Fred Goldstein, a principal at Interisle Consulting Group.
 Bill Lehr. Bill is an economist and consultant as well as a research associate at MIT's Computer Science & Artificial Intelligence Lab.
 Michelle Connolly, professor of the Practice of Economics, Duke University.

External links
 Columbia Institute for Tele-Information
 CITI's Harvey J. Levin Working Paper Series was first established in 1983 and completed in 1994, following Dr. Levin's death.  It is named for the noted communications economics pioneer, who was an Affiliated Research Fellow at the Institute and a former Columbia professor and Ph.D. graduate.

Columbia University
Columbia University research institutes